General Crack is a 1929 American pre-Code part-talkie historical costume melodrama with Technicolor sequences which was directed by Alan Crosland and produced and distributed  by Warner Bros. It was filmed and premiered in 1929, and released early in 1930. It stars John Barrymore in his first full-length talking feature. The film would prove to be Crosland and Barrymore's last historical epic together. It was based on the 1928 novel General Crack by the British writer Marjorie Bowen, published under the name George Preedy, one of her several pen names.

Plot
The film takes place in the 18th century Austria and revolves around Prince Christian, commonly known as General Crack (John Barrymore). His father had been a respectable member of the upper ranks of the nobility but his mother was a gypsy. General Crack, as a soldier of fortune,  spent his adult life selling his services to the highest bidder. He espouses the doubtful cause of Leopold II of Austria (Lowell Sherman, reigned 1790-1792) after demanding the sister of the emperor in marriage as well as half of the gold of the Holy Roman Empire. Before he has finished his work, however, he meets a gypsy dancer (Armida) and weds her. Complications arise when he takes his gypsy wife to the Austrian court and falls desperately in love with the emperor's sister (Marian Nixon). The court sequence was originally in Technicolor and proved to be Barrymore's last appearance in color.

Cast
John Barrymore as Duke of Kurland / Prince Christian
Philippe De Lacy as Young Christian
Lowell Sherman as Leopold II
Marian Nixon as Archduchess Maria Luisa
Armida as Fidelia
Hobart Bosworth as Count Hensdorff
Jacqueline Logan as Countess Carola
Otto Matieson as Col. Gabor
Andrés de Segurola as Col. Pons
Douglas Gerrard as Capt. Sweeney
Wilhelm von Brincken as Capt. Schmidt (credited as William von Brincken)
General Lodijensky as Capt Banning (credited as Theodore Lodi)
Nick Thompson as Typsy Chieftain
Curt Rehfeld as Lt. Dennis
Julanne Johnston as Court Lady
Guy Schact as Pietro
Carrie Daumery as Madame Frump (credited as Madame Daumery)

Box office
According to Warner Bros records the film earned $919,000 domestic and $401,000 foreign.

Preservation
The sound version of General Crack is lost. The silent version of this film, with Czech intertitles, survives, but does not have any of the original color sequences. Copies are located in the Czech archive and the Museum of Modern Art. Although the complete soundtrack for the sound version survives on Vitaphone disks, the silent version was either a "B" negative or an alternate take with intertitles. So while this is a legitimate version of the film, it does not match up with the Vitaphone soundtrack.

See also
List of early color feature films
List of incomplete or partially lost films

References

External links

General Crack details, virtual-history.com

1929 films
1920s historical drama films
1920s color films
Warner Bros. films
American historical drama films
Films directed by Alan Crosland
Films based on British novels
Films set in Austria
Films set in Brussels
Films set in the 1790s
Fictional representations of Romani people
American black-and-white films
Melodrama films
1929 drama films
1920s English-language films
1920s American films